Hammad ibn Buluggin (died 1028) was the first ruler of the Hammadid dynasty in what is now Algeria (1014–1028).

Life 
After the death of his father Buluggin ibn Ziri, al-Mansur ibn Buluggin (984–995), Hammad's brother, became the head of the Zirid dynasty in Ifriqiya, and installed Hammad as governor of the central Maghreb (grossly corresponding to the modern northern Algeria). He took on the Zanata tribes and eventually drove them into what is now modern-day Morocco. In 1007 Hammad founded the residence of al-Qala ("the Fortress") in the Hodna mountains west of Setif and embarked on an extensive building programme, which included a palace and mosque that became famous amongst contemporaries.

Following this Hammad gained ever more influence in the western Zirid realm. In 1014 he adopted Sunni Islam, declared his independence from the Zirids and recognised the Sunni Abbasids in Baghdad as being the rightful Caliphs (not the Shia Fatimids in Egypt, on whose behalf the Zirids ruled). Although there was initially conflict with the Zirids, in 1016 they were forced to conclude a ceasefire, and in 1018 they recognised the independence of the Hammadids.

The successor of Hammad was Qaid ibn Hammad (1028–1054), under whom relations with the Fatimids were re-established.

References

1028 deaths
Hammadids
Year of birth unknown
Converts to Sunni Islam from Shia Islam
11th-century rulers in Africa
11th-century Berber people